Valet Girls is a 1987 American comedy film directed by Rafal Zielinski, written by Clark Carlton, and starring Meri Marshall, April Stewart, Mary Kohnert, Jack DeLeon, Jon Sharp, Michael Karm, Steven Lyon, Randy Vasquez, Stuart Fratkin, and Tony Cox. The plot concerns three women in Los Angeles who are working as valet girls while trying to get started in the entertainment industry. The film was produced by Lexyn Productions and distributed by Empire International Pictures and Vestron Video.

Plot
The story revolves around Lucy (Meri Marshall), who wants to be a rock star, Rosalind (April Stewart), a brain pretending to be a bimbo, and Carnation (Mary Kohnert), who wants to be an actress. These three girls get a job parking cars for a big movie star named Dirk Zebra (Jack DeLeon) who throws regular house parties so that he and his fellow actor Lindsey Brawnsworth (Jon Sharp) and a record producer, Alvin Sunday (Michael Karm) can attract and seduce aspiring starlets.

Between parking cars, the three girls have to dodge the amorous attention of the party-goers while Lucy and Carnation try to get influential people to pay attention to their musical and acting talents. The party is sabotaged by members of a competing valet company (played by Steven Lyon, Randy Vasquez, and Stuart Fratkin) and the girls are blamed and fired. With the help of Dirk Zebra's wife Tina (Patricia Scott Michel) and Carnation's boyfriend Archie Lee (John Terlesky) the valet girls humiliate Dirk Zebra, Lindsey Brawnsworth, and the members of the other valet company.

Tony Cox appears as Lucy's friend and manager, Sammy. Ron Jeremy also made an appearance in an uncredited, minor roles.

Home media release
Valet Girls was released on VHS by Lions Gate on April 15, 1987.

External links

Fast-Rewind review
New York Times review

1987 films
1987 comedy films
American comedy films
Empire International Pictures films
Films directed by Rafal Zielinski
Films set in Los Angeles
Films shot in Los Angeles
American independent films
1980s English-language films
1980s American films